Dictyopterenes are a group of chemical compounds that are naturally present in marine and freshwater environments.  They are sexual attractants, or pheromones, found with several species of brown algae (Phaeophyceae). The chemical formula of dictyopterene A is trans-1-(trans-1-hexenyl)-2-vinylcyclopropane.  The chemical formula of dictyopterene C' is 6-butylcyclohepta-1,4-diene.  Dictyopterene A can be extracted from the essential oil of algae of the genus Dictyopteris.

Chemical structures

See also
 Dimethyl sulfide
 Ectocarpene, also known as Dictyopterene D'

References

External links
 

Pheromones
Cyclopropanes